"Don't Treat Me Like a Child" is the 1961 debut single of then fourteen-year-old Helen Shapiro, and was written by John Schroeder and Mike Hawker. The song was recorded at Abbey Road, with a nine piece band under the direction of Martin Slavin.

After Helen's appearance on the ITV musical programme Thank Your Lucky Stars, the record took off and reached a peak position of No. 3 in the UK charts, as well as being relatively well received in the rest of Europe.

International chart positions

References

Songs about parenthood
Songs about teenagers
1961 singles
Helen Shapiro songs
Songs written by John Schroeder (musician)
Columbia Graphophone Company singles
1961 songs
Songs written by Mike Hawker (songwriter)
Number-one singles in New Zealand